is a national park in Yamanashi, Shizuoka, and Kanagawa Prefectures, and western Tokyo Metropolis, Japan. It consists of Mount Fuji, Fuji Five Lakes, Hakone, the Izu Peninsula, and the Izu Islands.

Rather than being a specific spot, the park is a collection of dispersed tourist sites that dot the region. The farthest point south, the isle of Hachijō-jima, is several hundred kilometers from Mount Fuji. The park includes a variety of geographic features including natural hot springs, coastlines, mountainous areas, lakes, and more than 1000 volcanic islands. Vegetation in the park ranges from species of mountainous trees to the subtropical vegetation of the Izu Islands.

Fuji-Hakone-Izu National Park was established on February 2, 1936, as Fuji-Hakone National Park, and is one of the first four national parks established in Japan. In 1950, the Izu islands were added to the park, and its name changed to its present designation. Due to its proximity to the Tokyo metropolis and ease of transportation, it is the most visited national park in all Japan.

Nearby cities include Odawara, Fuji, Minami Ashigara, and Numazu.

Points of interest

Fuji-Hakone-Izu National Park is divided into four general areas:

1. Mount Fuji area
 Mount Fuji
 Shiraito Falls
 Fuji Five Lakes
 Aokigahara
 Lake Tanuki

2. Hakone area
 Old Tokaido Road
 Hakone Botanical Garden of Wetlands
 Ashi-no-ko Lake (Lake Ashi)
 Ōwakudani
 Hakone Park

3. Izu Peninsula
 Mount Amagi
 Atami hot springs
 Atagawa Tropical & Alligator Garden
 Jogasaki coast

4. Izu Islands
 Izu Ōshima
 To-shima
 Nii-jima
 Shikine-jima
 Kōzu-shima
 Miyake-jima
 Mikura-jima
 Hachijō-jima
The Izu islands are also a popular destination for scuba diving.

See also

List of national parks of Japan

References
Southerland, Mary and Britton, Dorothy. The National Parks of Japan. Kodansha International (1995).

Further reading

External links

Fuji-Hakone-Izu National Park

 
National parks of Japan
Parks and gardens in Kanagawa Prefecture
Parks and gardens in Shizuoka Prefecture
Parks and gardens in Tokyo
Parks and gardens in Yamanashi Prefecture
Protected areas established in 1936